110 Virginis is a star in the zodiac constellation Virgo, located 195 light-years away from the Sun. It is visible to the naked eye as an orange-hued star with an apparent visual magnitude of 4.40. The star is moving closer to the Earth with a heliocentric radial velocity of −16 km/s.

At the age of 4.5 billion years old, it belongs to a sub-category of giants called the red clump, which means it is on the horizontal branch and is generating energy through the helium fusion at its core. Compared to the Sun, it has 167% of the mass but has expanded to 11 times the size. The enlarged photosphere has an effective temperature of 4,664 K and is radiating 76 times the Sun's luminosity.

References 

K-type giants
Horizontal-branch stars
Virgo (constellation)
Durchmusterung objects
Virginis, 110
133165
073620
5601